The Portrait of a Lady is a 1996 British-American film directed by Jane Campion and adapted by Laura Jones from Henry James' 1881 novel of the same name.

The film stars Nicole Kidman, Barbara Hershey, John Malkovich, Mary-Louise Parker, Martin Donovan, Shelley Duvall, Richard E. Grant, Shelley Winters, Viggo Mortensen, Valentina Cervi, Christian Bale, and John Gielgud. It received two nominations at the 69th Academy Awards: Best Supporting Actress (Hershey) and Best Costume Design (Janet Patterson).

Premise
The film tells the story of Isabel Archer, an innocent young woman of independent means who is manipulated by her "friend" Madame Merle, and the devious Gilbert Osmond.

Plot
Isabel Archer is a very beautiful woman, who has already rejected many suitors: among them the wealthy Lord Warburton and Caspar Goodwood, to whom she had initially given hope. Caspar's arrival is arranged by Henrietta, a close friend of Isabel, who cares for her deeply. Isabel's strong character and free-spirited nature is adored by her cousin, Ralph Touchett, who persuades his father, her uncle, to give Isabel money so that she can be rich and independent. Upon her uncle's death, Isabel receives a fortune.

Isabel encounters Madame Serena and instantly likes her, however, learning about Isabel's wealth, Serena decides to arrange a marriage between Isabel and Serena's former lover Gilbert Osmond, who lives in Florence, Italy. Gilbert is a widower and has a daughter Pansy, who grew up in a convent and is not allowed to leave the house, even to walk in the garden, when her father is away. Isabel is enchanted by Gilbert and accepts the proposal; however, she's warned by Ralph that Gilbert is a "small man" and Isabel is giving up her dreams to be in a cage with a worthless husband. Isabel is enraged and slaps Ralph, to which he calmly answers that he said what he must, that he loves Isabel, and that he knows he has no hope. It's also evident that he's slowly dying from consumption.

Gilbert is nice to Isabel until after they are married. Isabel finds herself trapped in Rome in an unhappy marriage with a fear of her abusive husband, who gradually disconnects her from all of her friends. Henrietta, Ralph, and Caspar all leave for England. Pansy is also a victim of her father's overly protective behavior; she's in love with Rosier, but Gilbert has decided to arrange a marriage between her and Lord Warburton, who is attentive to Pansy just to get closer to Isabel. Isabel sees the mutual love between Pansy and Rosier and is deeply moved. Gilbert sees through Isabel's schemes to prevent Pansy becoming engaged to Warburton, but he is too late; Lord Warburton leaves Italy. Gilbert angrily slaps Isabel and steps on her dress so that she falls on the ground. Serena deeply regrets organizing the fateful union between Gilbert and Isabel.

Isabel learns that Ralph is overtaken by consumption and is on his deathbed. She asks Gilbert to let her to go to England to be with her dying cousin, but receives a cold and negative answer. Pansy is sent to a convent away from her lover. Isabel is pitied by Gilbert's sister, who finally opens Isabel's eyes, telling her that Gilbert's first wife was childless and Pansy is, in fact, Gilbert and Serena's daughter. Isabel finally decides to go against her husband's wishes and leave for England. She visits Pansy and proposes the girl to flee, but Pansy refuses, saying that she wants to please her father. In the convent, Isabel also encounters Serena, but proudly ignores her attempts to start a conversation. However, in the last minute before Isabel leaves, Serena runs to her - she has guessed Isabel is going to England to Ralph and reveals to Isabel that Ralph is the one that persuaded the uncle to give Isabel her fortune. On Ralph's deathbed, Isabel tearfully confesses that he's been her best friend and she loves him. Henrietta and Caspar attend Ralph's funeral. In the garden, Caspar tries to persuade Isabel to let go of her fear of her husband. They kiss passionately, but Isabel runs away to the house. She suddenly stops before the house door, and leans against it, looking back into the garden.

Cast 

 Nicole Kidman as Isabel Archer
 John Malkovich as Gilbert Osmond
 Barbara Hershey as Madame Serena Merle
 Mary-Louise Parker as Henrietta Stackpole
 Martin Donovan as Ralph Touchett
 Shelley Winters as Mrs. Touchett
 John Gielgud as Mr. Touchett
 Shelley Duvall as Countess Gemini
 Richard E. Grant as Lord Warburton
 Viggo Mortensen as Caspar Goodwood
 Christian Bale as Edward Rosier
 Valentina Cervi as Pansy Osmond
 Roger Ashton-Griffiths as Bob Bantling

Reception
The Portrait of a Lady received mixed reviews from critics. It holds a 46% approval rating on Rotten Tomatoes based on 72 reviews, with an average rating of 5.9/10. The consensus summarizes: "Beautiful, indulgently heady, and pretentious, The Portrait of a Lady paints Jane Campion's directorial shortcomings in too bright a light." On Metacritic, which assigns a normalized rating, the film has a score of 60 out of 100, based on 18 critics, indicating "mixed or average reviews". Audiences polled by CinemaScore gave the film a grade of "B-" on an A+ to F scale.

Accolades

Home media
On December 11, 2012, Shout! Factory released The Portrait of a Lady: Special Edition on DVD and Blu-ray.

See also
 Cinema of Australia

Notes

References

External links
 
 
 

1996 films
American romantic drama films
1990s feminist films
Films based on works by Henry James
Films based on American novels
Films directed by Jane Campion
Films set in Italy
Films set in the 19th century
Films scored by Wojciech Kilar
British romantic drama films
Films produced by Steve Golin
PolyGram Filmed Entertainment films
Gramercy Pictures films
1996 romantic drama films
1990s English-language films
1990s American films
1990s British films